The 2008 Eneco Tour of Benelux cycling road race takes place from 20 to 27 August 2008 in the Benelux. Like the previous years, parts of the Netherlands and Belgium are covered. The 18 UCI ProTour teams are participating and two extra teams were invited, namely Cycle Collstrop and Skil–Shimano who were each given a wild card.

Schedule

Stages

Prologue – 20 August 2008

Stage 1 – 21 August 2008

Stage 2 – 22 August 2008

Stage 3 – 23 August 2008

Stage 4 – 24 August 2008

Stage 5 – 25 August 2008

Stage 6 – 26 August 2008

Stage 7 – 27 August 2008 (ITT)

Points Classification
The leader of the points classification wears a red jersey.

Points in Prologue
Although in most stage races, the organisation gives away some points in the prologue, these were not given this year.

Points in Stage 1
1st Eneco Sprint after (45 km)

2nd Eneco Sprint after (98 km)

3rd Eneco Sprint after (156 km)

Finish in Roermond after (175.6 km)

Points in Stage 2
1st Eneco Sprint after (26 km)

2nd Eneco Sprint after (123 km)

3rd Eneco Sprint after (155 km)

Finish in Nieuwegein after (175 km)

Points in Stage 3
1st Eneco Sprint after (80 km)

2nd Eneco Sprint after (127 km)

3rd Eneco Sprint after (147 km)

Finish in Terneuzen after (185 km)

Jersey progress

During stage 5, Kenny van Hummel wore the points jersey as Tom Boonen did not start the stage.

Withdrawals
All teams were allowed to start with 8 riders. For 20 teams this would create a starting field of 160 riders. Just like previous years however, some teams chose to start with fewer riders, which reduced the number riders on the official starting list to 151.

UCI ProTour Points
The Eneco Tour of Benelux 2008 is part of the UCI ProTour and so the riders can earn UCI ProTour Points. Below is states which riders won points and where. Because the Eneco Tour of Benelux 2008 is a smaller stage race the points given are 3, 2 and 1 for the first three in each stage result. At the end of the tour, the top 10 in the standings receive points accorded as follows: 50, 40, 35, 30, 25, 20, 15, 10, 5 and 2.

Stage Results

Overall Result

Summary

See also
2008 in road cycling

References

External links
Race website

Eneco Tour of Benelux
Benelux Tour
Eneco
Eneco